York Region Paramedic Services provides legislated land ambulance services and paramedic care for the local municipalities within York Region.  Paramedic Services is a division of the Region's Paramedic and Seniors Service Branch. Prior to 2000, ambulance services were provided by 2 private operators (Beaverton & District Ambulance and Uxbridge - Stouffville Ambulance), York County Hospital, Nobleton Volunteer Ambulance and Ontario's Ministry of Health. The patchwork of service also had York Region dispatched by 3 different Ministry of Health Communication Centres (Aurora and north by Georgian CACC, Stouffville and Markham by Oshawa CACC and the remainder by Mississauga CACC). Georgian CACC now dispatches the whole region on the Ontario Government leased Bell Mobility Fleetnet VHF trunked radio system. There are approximately 480 full-time paramedics serving the region. Paramedic Operations are based in East Gwillimbury, Ontario.

Operations
York Region Paramedic Services operates emergency ambulances and Paramedic response units in the 9 local municipalities of the Regional Municipality of York.

Paramedic services on Georgina Island are provided by Georgina Island Fire Department (and boat transfers likely by Georgina Police Service from Fox and Snake Islands). The single ambulance is stationed at the Georgina Fire Department's fire hall on Chief Joseph Snake Road.

District 1

Town of Aurora
 Station 18 - Aurora - 220 Edward Street

Town of Newmarket
 Station 16 - Newmarket NW - Aspenwood
Station 19 - Newmarket SW - Harry Walker Parkway South

East Gwillimbury
 Station 15 - Mount Albert - 22 Princess Street, Mount Albert, Ontario
 Station 13 - Holland Landing - 2nd Concession Road, East Gwillimbury, Ontario
 Station 99 - York Region Paramedic Services Headquarters 80 Bales Drive East, Sharon, Ontario

Town of Georgina
 Station 12 - Keswick - 160 Morton Ave, Keswick, Ontario
 Station 10 - Pefferlaw - 319 Pefferlaw Road (York Regional Road 21), Pefferlaw, Ontario
 Station 11 - Sutton - 21001 Dalton Road, Sutton, Ontario

District 2
 Station 23 - Markham - Church - 280 Church Street, Markham, Ontario
 Station 24 - Unionville - 316 Main Street, Unionville, Ontario
Station 25 - Markham SE - 14th Avenue and Middlefield Road
Station 26 - Markham - Riviera - 10 Riviera Drive

Town of Whitchurch-Stouffville
 Station 21 - Stouffville - 100 Weldon Road
 Station 20 - Ballantrae - 15400 Highway 48, Ballantrae, Ontario

Town of Richmond Hill
 Station 28 - Richmond Hill - 171 Major MacKenzie Drive West (York Regional Road 25)

District 3

City of Vaughan
 Station 31 - 7690 Martin Grove Rd, Vaughan, Ontario
 Station 36 - Concord - 835 Clark Avenue West, Concord, Ontario
 Station 30 - Woodbridge - 9601 Islington Avenue (York Regional Road 17), Woodbridge, Ontario
 Station 34 - Racco Pkwy - 111 Racco Parkway, Vaughan, ON
 Station 32 - Maple - 9290 Keele Street (York Regional Road 72), Maple, Ontario

Township of King
 Station 38 - Schomberg - 15 Dilane Drive, Schomberg, Ontario
 Station 37 - Nobleton - 1 Old King Road, Nobleton, Ontario
 Station 39 - King City- 12825 Keele Street (York Regional Road 72), King City, Ontario

Fleet
 62 Ambulances - Type III ambulance - Demers Mystere ( 30XX, 31XX, 32XX, 34XX)
 9 Rapid Response Units (33XX)
 5 District Superintendent Units (37XX)
Ford Expedition and Ford Explorer Interceptor
 3 Supply Vehicles
 4 Administrative Vehicles (Supervisor) - unnumbered
 2 Driver Training Vehicles
 1 Community  Programs Vehicle (CP01)
 1 Emergency Support Unit Trailer (TR01)
 1 Rehab and Decon Trailer
 1 Emergency Support Unit Cargo Truck
 1 Emergency Support Unit and Command Unit (3650)
 1 Multi-patient transport unit - Crestline ElDorado National 40' Axess (3900)
 4 Special Response Units (Individual Paramedic, Pick-up chassis vehicle)  - (36XX)
 1 Off-road Ranger Ambulance
 3 Inflatable mobile hospital/treatment tents (2 - 25' round and 1 - 42'x22')

Services

 Primary Care Paramedics
 Advanced Care Paramedics
 Special Response Unit Medics - Bariatric Patient Transport, Tactical, CBRN, Incident Command, Marine
 Community Event Services -  Bike Unit, Special Event Paramedic Standbys
 Heart Alive - Public Access Defibrillation (PAD) program
 Community Programs - Public education and safety promotion
 Research and Clinical Programs
 Community Paramedicine - "EPIC" research trial in association with Health for All and Markham Family Health Team and St Michael's Hospital 
 Performance and Development - Paramedic recruitment, in-house training, Advanced Care Paramedic training
 Professional Standards - Patient inquiries, health record inquiries
 Patient Advocacy Unit in the Office of the Chief

See also 
Paramedicine in Canada
List of EMS Services in Ontario
Paramedics in Canada
Emergency Medical Services in Canada

Emergency Services in York Region
 York Regional Police
 Fire Services in York Region
 Vaughan Fire and Rescue Services

References

External links

 EMS Operations

Ambulance services in Canada
Regional Municipality of York
2000 establishments in Ontario